These are the official results of the 2012 Asian Indoor Athletics Championships which took place on 18–19 February 2012 in Hangzhou, China.

Men's results

60 meters

Heats – 18 February

Semifinals – 18 February

Final – 19 February

400 meters

Heats – 18 February

Final – 18 February

800 meters
19 February

1500 meters
18 February

3000 meters
19 February

60 meters hurdles

Heats – 18 February

Final – 18 February

High jump
19 February

Pole vault
18 February

Long jump
18 February

Triple jump
19 February

Shot put
19 February

Heptathlon
18–19 February

Women's results

60 meters

Heats – 18 February

Semifinals – 18 February

Final – 19 February

400 meters

Heats – 18 February

Final – 18 February

800 meters
19 February

1500 meters
18 February

3000 meters
19 February

60 meters hurdles

Heats – 18 February

Final – 18 February

4 x 400 meters relay
19 February

High jump
18 February

Pole vault
19 February

Long jump
18 February

Triple jump
18 February

Shot put
18 February

Pentathlon
February 19

References
Results

Asian Indoor Championships Results
Events at the Asian Indoor Athletics Championships